The 2019 Use Your Melon Drive Sober 200 is a NASCAR Xfinity Series race held on October 5, 2019, at Dover International Speedway in Dover, Delaware. Contested over 200 laps on the 1-mile (1.6 km) concrete speedway, it was the 29th race of the 2019 NASCAR Xfinity Series season, third race of the Playoffs, and the last race of the Round of 12.

Background

Track

Dover International Speedway is an oval race track in Dover, Delaware, United States that has held at least two NASCAR races since it opened in 1969. In addition to NASCAR, the track also hosted USAC and the NTT IndyCar Series. The track features one layout, a  concrete oval, with 24° banking in the turns and 9° banking on the straights. The speedway is owned and operated by Dover Motorsports.

Entry list

Practice

First practice

Final practice

Qualifying

Qualifying results

. – Playoffs driver

Race
Chase Briscoe started at the rear of the field due to electrical issues, so Austin Cindric started on pole. On the second lap, Tyler Reddick slid on the frontstretch and Justin Allgaier followed, causing Harrison Burton and Brandon Jones to wreck behind them. This wreck caused Jones to be eliminated from the playoffs. On lap 22, John Hunter Nemechek spun Mike Harmon and brought out the second caution. Allgaier took the lead and won Stage 1.

Allgaier continued his lead to win Stage 2. Briscoe took the lead afterwards and dominated. Cole Custer, Michael Annett, and Justin Haley stayed out late in the pit cycle, which proved to be beneficial when Dillon Bassett caused a caution when he spun entering pit road. Allgaier got the free pass, while Briscoe and Cindric took the wave-around, causing only six cars to be on the lead lap during the restart.

Custer sped past Allgaier on the restart, then remained in the lead after the last one caused by Stephen Leicht, Matt Mills, and Ray Black Jr. being involved in an accident with seven laps left. Custer held off Allgaier to take the race win. With Jones eliminated in the opening laps, Nemechek needed Annett to struggle in order to pass him in points while Haley and Ryan Sieg needed to win the race to advance. Since Nemechek didn't gain 10 points more than Annett, he was eliminated from the playoffs alongside Haley and Sieg.

Summary

Stage Results

Stage One
Laps: 60

Stage Two
Laps: 60

Final Stage Results

Stage Three
Laps: 80

. – Driver advanced to the next round of the playoffs.

. – Driver was eliminated from the playoffs.

References

NASCAR races at Dover Motor Speedway
2019 in sports in Delaware
Use Your Melon Drive Sober 200
2019 NASCAR Xfinity Series